Pricetown may refer to:

In the United States
Pricetown, Highland County, Ohio, an unincorporated community
Pricetown, Trumbull County, Ohio, an unincorporated community in Mahoning and Trumbull counties
Pricetown, Pennsylvania, an unincorporated community

Elsewhere
Price Town, Ogmore Vale, Wales